Freshwater Place is a residential skyscraper in the Southbank district of Melbourne, Australia. The building has a total of 536 apartment units. Construction was completed in 2005.

The residential tower has three sections: podium, mid rise and high rise. The high rise section has a common area on the 40th floor known as the "Skyline Club" which houses an infinity pool, spa and steam room, gym and theatre. The 10th floor, which is an accessible floor, is equipped with a swimming pool, spa and steam room, gym, media room, business centre, BBQ pits and a half acre rooftop garden.

Location
Freshwater Place is located across the river from the Melbourne CBD. It is positioned next to the Eureka Tower, Prima Pearl and Crown Casino.

Freshwater Place Arcade
Freshwater Place Arcade is located on the ground floor of the residential tower. Some shops include: 
McDonald's
Frankie Walter Peta
Criniti's Italian Restaurant
Meat & Wine Co. Melbourne
7-Eleven
IGA supermarket
Subway
Freshwater Place Pharmacy
Queensbridge Square Medical Centre 
Shuji Sushi
Chelsini's Pizza
Kenny's Bakery Cafe
Cafenatics
Guava Bean
Blossom
Tinson Jewellers & Pawnbrokers

See also
List of tallest buildings in Melbourne
List of tallest buildings in Australia

External links

Skyscrapers in Melbourne
Residential buildings completed in 2005
Residential skyscrapers in Australia
Apartment buildings in Melbourne
Shopping centres in Victoria (Australia)
Modernist architecture in Australia
2005 establishments in Australia
Buildings and structures in the City of Melbourne (LGA)
Southbank, Victoria